Money Isn't Everything is a 1925 British silent romance film directed by Thomas Bentley and starring Olive Sloane, Lewis Gilbert and Gladys Hamer. The film was made at Cricklewood Studios by Stoll Pictures, and was based on a novel by Sophie Cole.

Cast
 Olive Sloane as Elizabeth Tuter 
 Lewis Gilbert   
 Gladys Hamer as Adele Rockwell 
 John F. Hamilton as William Channon 
 Arthur Burne as James Rogers 
 Gladys Crebbin

References

Bibliography
 Low, Rachael. History of the British Film, 1918-1929. George Allen & Unwin, 1971.

External links

1925 films
1920s romance films
British romance films
1920s English-language films
Films directed by Thomas Bentley
Stoll Pictures films
Films based on British novels
Films set in England
British silent feature films
British black-and-white films
Silent romance films
1920s British films